Frog House is an example of Art Nouveau architecture in the city of Bielsko-Biała, in southern Poland's Silesia Province. It features two frogs seated over the entrance, one smoking a pipe and the other playing a mandolin, while beetles roam freely over the walls.

The Frog House stands on Bielsko-Biała's Polish Army Square (plac Wojska Polskiego).

Art Nouveau architecture in Poland
Buildings and structures in Bielsko-Biała
Art Nouveau apartment buildings